Zuckerkandl's tubercle may refer to:

 Zuckerkandl's tubercle (thyroid gland)
 Zuckerkandl's tubercle (teeth)